Shamus may refer to:

 Shamus (video game), a 1982 computer game from Synapse Software
 Shamus (film), a 1973 film starring Burt Reynolds
 Shamus Culhane (1908–1996), American animator, film director and producer
 Shamus Khan (born 1978), American sociologist
 Shamus O'Brien (1907–1981), Scottish-American soccer player
 Gareb Shamus, CEO of Wizard Entertainment
 Shamus Wong, a character from the children's book Tracey McBean
 Colloquial term for a private detective

See also
 Shamu, SeaWorld's first killer whale (died 1971) 
 Shamu (SeaWorld show), SeaWorld's contemporary killer whale shows 
 Seamus (disambiguation)
 Sheamus (born 1978), Irish professional wrestler
 Shammes or Gabbai, a term for the sexton or caretaker of a synagogue